Eutyches (c. 380c. 456) or Eutyches of Constantinople was a presbyter and archimandrite at Constantinople.  He first came to notice in 431 at the First Council of Ephesus, for his vehement opposition to the teachings of Nestorius; his condemnation of Nestorianism as heresy led him to an equally extreme, although opposite view, which precipitated his being denounced as a heretic himself.

Life
Eutyches was an archimandrite of a monastery outside the walls of Constantinople, where he ruled over 300 monks. He was much respected and was godfather to Chrysaphius, an influential eunuch at the court  of Theodosius II.

Controversy

The patriarch of Constantinople, Nestorius, having asserted that Mary ought not to be referred to as the "Mother of God" (Theotokos in Greek, literally "God-bearer"), was denounced as a heretic; in combating this assertion of Patriarch Nestorius, Eutyches declared that Christ was "a fusion of human and divine elements", causing his own denunciation as a heretic twenty years after the First Council of Ephesus at the 451 AD Council of Chalcedon. 

The Editors of Encyclopaedia Britannica state

According to Nestorius, all the human experiences and attributes of Christ are to be assigned to 'the man', as a personal subject distinct from God the Word, though united to God the Word from the moment of conception. In opposition to this, Eutyches inverted the assertion to the opposite extreme, asserting that human nature and divine nature were combined into the single nature of Christ without any alteration, absorption or confusion: that of the incarnate Word. Although this accorded with the later teaching of Cyril of Alexandria, Eutyches went beyond Cyril in denying that Christ was "consubstantial with us men", by which he did not intend to deny Christ's full manhood, but to stress His uniqueness.

Career
Eutyches denied that Christ's humanity was limited or incomplete, a view that some thought similar to the Alexandrine doctrine. (This, however, is strongly rejected by the Coptic church, which sees Eutyches a heretic.) In any event, the energy and imprudence with which Eutyches asserted his opinions led to his being misunderstood.  He was accused of heresy by Domnus II of Antioch and Eusebius, bishop of Dorylaeum at a synod presided over by Flavian at Constantinople in 448. His explanations deemed unsatisfactory, the council deposed him from his priestly office and excommunicated him.

In 449, however, the Second Council of Ephesus was convened by Dioscorus of Alexandria, who was under the impression that Eutyches had renounced Monophysitism. Overawed by the presence of a large number of Egyptian monks, the council not only reinstated Eutyches to his office but also deposed Eusebius, Domnus, and Flavian, his chief opponents. The council's judgment conflicted with the opinion of the bishop of Rome, Leo, who, departing from the policy of his predecessor Celestine, had written very strongly to Flavian in support of the doctrine of the two natures and one person.

Meanwhile, the emperor Theodosius II died. His successor, Marcian, married Theodosius's sister, Pulcheria. In October 451, Marcian and Pulcheria summoned a council (the fourth ecumenical) which met at Chalcedon, which Dioscorus attended and at which he was condemned. There the synod of Ephesus was called a "robber synod," at which, it was said, Dioscorus had threatened the bishops with death if they did not agree with him. That previous synod's proceedings were annulled and, in accordance with the more miaphysite strand in the teaching of Cyril of Alexandria, it was declared that the two natures are united in Christ (without any alteration, absorption or confusion) and 'come together to form one person and one hypostasis.' Eutyches died in exile, but of his later life nothing is known.

Those who did not approve the Chalcedonian Council were later accused of being "Monophysites" and are nowadays known as "Oriental Orthodox," a phrase that today encompasses the Coptic Church, the Armenian Orthodox Church, and the Syrian Orthodox Church. They were wrongfully accused of agreeing with Eutyches about "one nature" in Christ and of rejecting Christ's dual consubstantiality (with the Father and with us men); however, Oriental Orthodox churches prefer to be called "Miaphysites" and are against the teachings of Eutyches. This was confirmed in May 1973 when the late Coptic pope, Shenouda III, visited Rome and penned a Christological statement with Pope Paul VI.

Eutyches's memory was kept alive by the Chalcedonians such as Leo I, who used the term 'Eutychian' as a pejorative description of the non-Chalcedonians who in their turn accused the Chalcedonians of being 'Nestorians' and dyophysites.

Notes

References
 G. A. Bevan and P. T. R. Gray, "The Trial of Eutyches: A New Interpretation", Byzantinische Zeitschrift 101 (2009), 617–57.
 Cohen, Samuel (2020). "Eutychianorum furor! Heresiological Comparison and the Invention of Eutychians in Leo I's Christological Polemic". Entangled Religions. 11(4). doi:10.46586/er.11.2020.9434. ISSN 2363-6696.
 Adolf Harnack, History of Dogma, iv. passim
 F. Loofs, Dogmnegeschichte (4th ed., 1906), 297 ff. 
 
 
 
 R. L. Ottley, The Doctrine of the Incarnation, ii. 97 ff.
 Article in Herzog-Hauck, Realencyk. für prot. Theol., with a full bibliography. 
 

380s births
450s deaths
4th-century Romans
Byzantine theologians
Christologists
Founders of religions
People declared heretics by the first seven ecumenical councils
5th-century Christian clergy
5th-century Christian theologians